Kim Min-jun (born January 15, 1988), better known by his stage name Jun. K, is a South Korean rapper, singer, songwriter, record producer, dancer and actor. He is the main vocalist of 2PM.

Formerly known as Kim Jun-su (Hangul : 김준수), he revealed on October 17, 2012, that due to family reasons he would be changing his name to Min-jun, though his stage name would remain the same.

Jun. K is the writer and the composer of 2PM's title songs, "Go Crazy","My House" and "With Me Again".He also wrote and composed many b-side tracks for 2PM.

Aside from his group activities, Jun. K has released 3 digital singles, 2 extended plays in South Korea and 1 digital single, 4 extended plays in Japan, his first three Japanese albums which peaked at number two on the Oricon Weekly Albums Chart. His second Japanese album Love Letter ranked number one on both Billboard Japan "Top" and "Hot" album sales charts. His first Korean album, Mr. NO♡, debuted at number nine on Billboard World Albums chart. His third Japanese album "No Shadow" ranked number two on Billboard Japan "Top" and "Hot" album sales charts. His fourth Japanese album No Time ranked number three on the Oricon daily sales chart.

Early life
Kim Minjun was born in Daegu, South Korea and attended Dong-ah Institute of Media and Arts. Prior to singing, he had entered and won various poem and songwriting contests. He attended Kyunghee University's Media Information Graduate School for his master's degree.

He originally auditioned for YG Entertainment, where he befriended G-Dragon and Taeyang of Big Bang. He was accepted into both YG Entertainment and JYP Entertainment, and ended up signing with the latter. He remains close friends with both members of BigBang.

Career

2008–2010: Debut with 2 pm and solo activities

Jun. K was chosen as main vocalist of 2PM. The group official debuted on September 4, 2008.

During a 2 pm fanmeeting in 2009, he performed his composition "Hot" for the first time for his solo. "Hot" was later recorded by all six members and included on their second studio album Hands Up (2011). In 2010, he collaborated with composer Jung Woo on the track "Tok Tok Tok" released in August, provided guest vocals for then-labelmate San E's song "B.U.B.U." (an acronym for "Break Up Back Up"), released in September as part of his first extended play, and teamed up with other idols and singers for the 2010 G-20 Seoul summit campaign song "Let's Go," released in October.

2011–2013: Solo debut and musical role
On October 7, 2011, Jun. K released his debut single "Alive". The accompanying music video was uploaded to 2PM's official YouTube channel three days later. The song quickly climbed the charts and became number one on Cyworld. On March 14, 2012, it was released as a ringtone on Japan's Recochoku ahead of 2 pm's greatest hits album 2PM Best: 2008–2011 in Korea, where it could also be found as a bonus track in Limited Edition B. "Alive" managed to quickly rank in at number one on the daily chart. Following this, JYP Entertainment stated that the song "shows a deeper look into Jun. K's unique musical world. It has a smooth beat that reveals a new charm to the singer." He also recorded "Love... Goodbye" for the soundtrack of the Korean drama I Love Lee Tae-ri. It served as the male lead's theme. He began his acting career in 2012 with played in musical theatre The Three Musketeers. Jun. K played as D'Artagnan.
He was played as Daniel in musical, Jack the Ripper in early 2013.

In December 2013, He participated again on musical The Three Musketeers to performed in Tokyo, Japan.

2014–present: Solo activities 
In an interview with The Star in 2014, Jun. K revealed that Oricon's editor-in-chief had said Love and Hate was the number one album released in Japan that year and expressed his gratitude: "When I heard this I felt even better. I have really worked hard without any rest since December last year. I tried my best preparing it, but I'm really thankful to everyone who helped me achieve this good result, and everyone who congratulated me."

Jun. K's Love & Hate concert tour ranked in the top 10 best concerts in Japan by Ranking Box, for having one of the most impressive live concerts of 2014, making him the only K-pop artist on the list. 
The editor-in-chief stated, "The album I personally listened to the most this year is Jun.K's solo album, 'Love & Hate', which was released in May. He's an artist who has an outstanding ability as a singer-songwriter, impressive voice tone, and musical talent. His solo live concert was rich with not only lyrical music but expressiveness as well."

On June 11, 2014, Jun.K released the Korean version of "No Love". Another song from the Japanese EP, titled "Mr. Doctor", was featured on HOT 97's DJ LEAD's Mix Album twice, in 2014 and 2015.

Jun.K's second Japanese album, Love Letter, was released on November 25, 2015, and quickly reached number one on the Oricon daily album charts and on Japan's Billboard charts for top album sales. On December 30, 2015, the Korean version of Love Letter was released.

In July 2016, Jun. K announced the release of his first Korean mini album, Mr. No♡, digitally on August 9 and physically on August 11. He held a showcase on August 8 before releasing his album and the showcase also aired on Naver's V app.

Jun.K's third Japanese album, No Shadow, was released on December 14, 2016, and reached number one on the Oricon daily album charts and number two on the Oricon weekly album charts and Japan's Billboard charts for top and hot album sales.

On January 4, 2017, Jun. K released a surprise music video for his song "Your Wedding", for his return as a solo artist in Korea. The music video stars 2 pm's Nichkhun and TWICE's Nayeon. "Your Wedding" is a pre-release for Jun. K's self composed album titled 77-1X3-00. On January 12, 2017, Jun. K released the Korean album 77-1X3-00, as well as the music video for its title track, "No Shadow".

Jun. K's second concert tour "Love Letter" and third concert tour "No Shadow" ranked in each year's top 10+1 best concerts in Japan by Yahoo in a row, for having the most impressive two live concert tours of 2015 and 2016 making him the only K-pop artist on the lists.

On November 27, 2017, Jun. K released his second Korean mini album My 20's as the final project in Korea before his army enlistment.
"Moving Day" is the title track, and the album includes songs he personally composed and wrote.

Jun. K's fourth Japanese album, No Time, was released on April 4, 2018, as the final project in Japan before his army enlistment, No Time debuted at number three on the Oricon daily album chart.

Jun. K ’s fourth Korean single and the first Japanese digital single “This Is Not A Song, 1929” was released in both Korea and Japan simultaneously on June 10, 2020. On the same day, he carried out a free online concert "THIS IS NOT A SPECIAL LIVE" for his fans to show his gratitude towards their continued support.

On December 9, 2020, Jun. K released his third Korean mini album 20 Minutes, with "30 Minutes Might Be Too Long" serving as the album's title track.

On March 10, 2021, Jun. K released his fifth Japanese album, This Is Not a Song.

In July 2022, it was announced that Jun.K would hold a fan meeting 2022 FAN MEETING < WE, LOVE ON, AGAIN> in Japan on September 23.

Personal life 
Jun. K speaks Korean, English, and Japanese. His hobbies include composing, fashion, collecting accessories and shoes. His specialties are singing and writing themes.

He revealed that he had received over 70 awards from elementary to high school related to writing such as essays and book reports. 
"When I was young, I read a lot of books. My mother liked writing. She helped me all the way from writing book reports."

He is a Buddhist. On February 24, 2011, he was admitted into the bachelor program for Performing Arts at the Dong-Ah Institute of Media and Arts, starting his new semester as a fourth year student.

On October 17, 2012, he announced that he would be legally changing his name from Kim Junsu to Kim Minjun due to family reasons. In a 2014 interview with Starcast, he discussed the change: "There are still hateful comments about me changing my name. It is a name which my father gave it to me in advance before he passed away after thinking when to give it to me. I talked about it for 8 months with my mother. I thought about it for a long time since changing name didn't feel good to me."

On February 10, 2018, Jun. K was discovered to have been driving under the influence of alcohol at a sobriety checkpoint that was set up at the intersection near Sinsa Station. He was reported to have been indicted without physical detention as he had a blood alcohol content level of 0.074 percent. Jun. K personally apologized for his recent drunk driving incident, resulting in him not joining his fellow 2PM members on stage for the 2018 PyeongChang Winter Olympics Headliner Show.

Jun. K joined Nodo training center, 2nd infantry division of 1st ROK Army, in Gangwon-do Yanggu to fulfill his mandatory military service on May 8, 2018. He received a silver medal with an honorable mention from the commander of the division for his outstanding performance as a trainee at the training camp graduation ceremony. After completing the training session successfully, Jun. K was assigned to a military band as a saxophone player and a singer.

On May 31, 2019, Jun. K received the status of "Special Class Warrior" which is considered a measure of success as a soldier as it is only awarded to those who excel in shooting, physical endurance, first aid, vigilance, CBR training, mental endurance, and combat skills.

Jun. K completed his military service and was discharged on January 2, 2020.

Discography

Filmography

Television Series

Reality show

Variety show

Web Show

Music videos

Theater

References

External links 

1988 births
Living people
2PM members
Dong-ah Institute of Media and Arts alumni
JYP Entertainment artists
South Korean Buddhists
South Korean male idols
South Korean male singers
South Korean pop singers
South Korean rhythm and blues singers